Aetos ( meaning "eagle") is a village and a former municipality in Messenia, Peloponnese, Greece. Since the 2011 local government reform it is part of the municipality Trifylia, of which it is a municipal unit. The municipal unit has an area of 94.850 km2. In 2011 its population was 360 for the village and 1,915 for the municipal unit. The seat of the former municipality was in Kopanaki.

Subdivisions
The municipal unit Aetos is subdivided into the following communities (constituent villages in brackets):
Aetos
Agrilia Trifylia (Nea Agrilia)
Artiki
Glykorrizi
Kamari
Kefalovrysi (Kefalovrysi, Tsertsaiika)
Kryoneri
Kopanaki (Kopanaki, Agios Dimitrios, Rizochori)
Monastiri
Polythea
Sitochori

References

External links
Statistics of Aetos from the Messenia's/Messinia's official website

Populated places in Messenia